"Chapter 7" (or "Episode 107") is the seventh episode of the first season of the American political thriller drama series House of Cards. It premiered on February 1, 2013, when it was released along with the rest of the first season on the American streaming service Netflix.

Plot
President Walker (Michel Gill) finally signs the education bill, earning Frank (Kevin Spacey) a major victory by affording him great influence with Walker. Vice President Jim Matthews (Dan Ziskie) expresses discontent with Walker, feeling sidelined within the administration. Matthews further questions Russo's (Corey Stoll) ability to run for governor of Pennsylvania, the office Matthews previously occupied.

Doug (Michael Kelly) receives a letter from Rachel Posner (Rachel Brosnahan), who asks for money and a place to live in order in return for her silence regarding Russo's DUI arrest. Frank turns his basement into Russo's de facto campaign headquarters while Russo continuously attends AA meetings with Doug. However, when confronting his past wrongdoings, Russo starts to have doubts about his campaign.

Frank contacts Christina (Kristen Connolly) to get back together with Russo and become his deputy campaign manager. Doug asks Nancy (Elizabeth Norment) to house Rachel until he finds a suitable place for Rachel. After not hearing from Frank for several weeks, Zoe texts him and asks his whereabouts. Frank tells her about Russo's campaign. She gives the scoop to Janine, who is considering leaving the Herald for Slugline. Frank visits Zoe's apartment and sees Lucas (Sebastian Arcelus) kissing her. Afterwards, Frank lifts up Zoe's dress, pulls down her black panties and performs cunnilingus on Zoe while she is on the phone.

Cast
Following is the list of billed cast.

Main cast 
 Kevin Spacey as U.S. Representative Francis J. Underwood 
 Robin Wright as Claire Underwood, Francis' wife
 Kate Mara as Zoe Barnes, reporter at The Washington Herald
 Michael Kelly as Doug Stamper, Underwood's Chief of Staff
 Sakina Jaffrey as Linda Vasquez, White House Chief of Staff
 Corey Stoll as U.S. Representative Peter Russo
 Kristen Connolly as Christina Gallagher, a congressional staffer
 Sandrine Holt as Gillian Cole, employee at CWI
 Ben Daniels as Adam Galloway, a New York-based photographer and Claire's love interest 
 Boris McGiver as Tom Hammerschmidt, editor-in-chief for The Washington Herald
 Sebastian Arcelus as Lucas Goodwin, a reporter and editor for The Washington Herald
 Michel Gill as United States President Garrett Walker  
 Dan Ziskie as Vice President Jim Matthews

Recurring characters 
 Elizabeth Norment as Nancy Kaufberger
 Nathan Darrow as Edward Meechum
 Constance Zimmer as Janine Skorsky
 Karl Kenzler as Charles Holburn
 Francie Swift as Felicity Holburn
 Rachel Brosnahan as Rachel Posner
 Larry Pine as Bob Birch 
 Suzanne Savoy as Patricia Whittaker
 Tawny Cypress as Carly Heath
 Kenneth Tigar as Walter Doyle
 James Hindman as Nash Aarons
 Chuck Cooper as Barney Hull
 Curtiss Cook as Terry Womack

Reception
The episode received positive reviews from critics. Ryan McGee of The A.V. Club said, "The show now has earned enough goodwill to not dismiss that plot out of hand, even if it feels designed to either pay off something in four episodes or utterly snatch defeat from the jaws of victory at precisely the same time. The show hasn't had to get truly bloody when tying off loose ends yet." He further said, "it's probably time for the show to introduce some truly life-or-death stakes for this to move beyond interesting television into something truly compelling."

Notes

External links
 House of Cards on Netflix
 

2013 American television episodes
House of Cards (American TV series) episodes